Kedong County is a county under the jurisdiction of Qiqihar City in west-central Heilongjiang province, the People's Republic of China.

Administrative divisions 
Kedong County include five towns and two townships.

Towns 
 Kedong, Yugang, Baoquan, Qianfeng, Puyulu
Townships 
 Runjin, Changsheng

Climate

See also
List of administrative divisions of Heilongjiang

References

External links
Official website of Kedong

Districts of Qiqihar